Four vessels named True Briton have sailed as East Indiamen for the British East India Company (EIC):
 was launched at Rotherhithe and made four voyages to India or China for the EIC before she was sold in 1760 for breaking up.
 was launched at Deptford and made four voyages to India and China  for the EIC before she was sold in 1772 for breaking up.
 was launched at Deptford and made four voyages to India or China for the EIC. In 1786 she was sold and renamed Carnatic. Carnatic made one voyage to China for the EIC and then was sold in 1788 for use as a hulk.
 made seven voyages for the EIC; she was lost without a trace in 1809 during her eighth voyage.

Ship names